Stuurman is a surname. Notable people with the surname include:

David Stuurman (circa 1773–1830), South African activist
Eric Stuurman (born 1965), Dutch wheelchair tennis player
Glenton Stuurman (born 1992), South African cricketer
Pieter Stuurman (born 1981), South African cricketer